An Agaluk was a feudal unit of the Ottoman Empire governed by an agha (tax collector landlord).

In Bosnian history, an agaluk may often refer to land owned by an aga.

See also
Subdivisions of the Ottoman Empire
Kadiluk
Pashaluk
Sanjak
 Timar, land granted by the Ottoman sultans between the fourteenth and sixteenth centuries

References

Subdivisions of the Ottoman Empire
Types of administrative division
Feudalism in the Ottoman Empire